The phonological system of the Hawaiian language is based on documentation from those who developed the Hawaiian alphabet during the 1820s as well as scholarly research conducted by lexicographers and linguists from 1949 to present.

Hawaiian has only eight consonant phonemes: . The – variation is highly unusual among the world's languages.

Hawaiian has either 5 or 25 vowel phonemes, depending on how long vowels and diphthongs are analyzed. If the long vowels and diphthongs are treated as two-phoneme sequences, the total of vowel phonemes is five. However, if the long vowels and diphthongs are treated as separate, unit phonemes, there are 25 vowel phonemes. There is some allophonic variation of the vowels, but it is much less dramatic than that of the consonants.

Hawaiian syllable structure is (C)V(V) where C is any consonant and V is any vowel, which can be long or short. Double vowels (VV) represent falling diphthongs, whose first elements can be either long or short. All CV(V) syllables occur except for wū, but wu occurs only in two words borrowed from English. Word stress is predictable in words of one to four syllables but not in words of five or more syllables. Phonological processes in Hawaiian include palatalization and deletion of consonants and the raising, diphthongization, deletion, and compensatory lengthening of vowels. Phonological reduction (or "decay") of consonant phonemes during the historical development of Hawaiian has resulted in the phonemic glottal stop. The ultimate loss (deletion) of intervocalic consonant phonemes has resulted in long vowels and diphthongs.

Phonemes and allophones 
The following description of Hawaiian phonemes and their allophones is based on the experiences of the people who developed the Hawaiian alphabet, as described by Schütz, and on the descriptions of Hawaiian pronunciation and phonology made by Lyovin, and Elbert & Pukui. Some additional details on glottal consonants are found in Carter. A recent overview of Hawaiian segmental phonology has been given by Parker Jones.

The American missionaries who developed written Hawaiian during the 1820s found that a  reflex was common at the Kauai (Tauai) end of the island chain, and a  reflex at the Big Island (island of Hawaii) end. However, that does not prevent anyone from using the t realization, in speaking or in writing, if they so desire. T is used more than k by speakers of Niihau Hawaiian.

The spread of literacy in the Hawaiian alphabet likely contributed to the spread of the  allophone to Hawaii's westernmost islands.

Consonants 
Hawaiian has one of the smallest consonant inventories (Rotokas or Pirahã may be smaller depending on the analysis) and one of the smallest phoneme inventories.

{| class="wikitable" style="text-align: center;"
|+ Consonants
!
! width="60px" | Labial
! width="60px" | Alveolar
! width="40px" | Velar
! width="60px" | Glottal
|-
! Nasal
| 
| 
|
|
|-
! Stop
| 
| colspan="2" |     ⁓    
| 
|-
! Fricative
|
|
|
| 
|-
! Sonorant
|  ⁓ 
|  ⁓  ⁓ 
|
|
|}

Elbert & Pukui point out some instances of a  allophone. Schütz conjectured that a t-dialect existed in the northwestern islands, and a k-dialect in the southeastern islands.
As of the 1820s, the  variant was becoming dominant on Oahu.

Schütz conjectured that there was neither  nor , but rather "something between the two". This is most likely , a labiodental approximant (see also Schütz's (1994:113) quotes from letter of Artemas Bishop).

Carter showed instances of synchronic alternation of every non-glottal Hawaiian consonant  with glottal fricative  and glottal stop . (See Hawaiian phonology#Glottal stop)

There are also instances of variation with null allophones. For example:  ('turn');  ('variety of shark').

Some loanwords have been adapted to Hawaiian's consonant system, while others have motivated changes to Hawaiian's phonology and a division in its lexicon between native, core words and peripheral, foreign ones. For example, when adapting English loanwords, every single non-labial and non-glottal occlusive in English could be mapped to Hawaiian . That said, other, less phonologically adapted loanwords show a number of consonants not native to Hawaiian phonology.

Glottal stop 
In Hawaiian, a phonemic glottal stop historically derives from an earlier consonant. A number of words have variant pronunciations between glottal (that is, both  and ) and non-glottal consonants; it is conjectured that the forms with a non-glottal consonant are older and that this phenomenon is part of a process of consonant deletion. Word-medial glottal stops may be realized as creaky voice.

This can still be seen in the historical development of the dual personal pronouns. This is exhibited in the suffixes for dual and plural number, which come from lua ('two') and kolu ('three') respectively.

{| class="wikitable" style="text-align: center;"
|+ Dual pronouns
!
! 1st person exclusive
! 1st person inclusive
! 2nd person
! 3rd person
|-
! Meaning
| we two
| we two
| you two
| they two
|-
! Old form
| 
| 
| 
| 
|-
! Glottal form
| 
| 
|
| 
|-
! New form
| 
| 
|
| 
|}

The presence of the glottal stop marks the absence of a "phonetically fuller" consonant.

A Hawaiian glottal stop thus represents the maximal phonetic reduction of other consonants in centuries past.

Carter (1996:373–374) showed examples of all seven of the (other) Hawaiian consonants alternating synchronically with glottal stop:

{| class="wikitable" style="text-align: center;"
! 
! 
! 
! 
! 
! 
! 
! 
|-
! Meaning
| ear
| long
| circle
| reddish-brown
| tern
| light
| glowing red
|-
! Old form
| 
| 
| 
| 
| 
| 
| 
|-
! Glottal form
| 
| 
| 
| 
| 
| 
| 
|}

Vowels 
Depending on how one analyzes the inventory of Hawaiian vowel phonemes, it has either 5 or 25 phonemes. Diphthongs and long vowels are analyzed as being sequences of two vowels. For example, the written form  is phonemically , and the written form  is phonemically . The maximum figure of 25 is reached by counting separately the 5 short vowels, the 5 long vowels, the 9 short diphthongs, and the 6 long diphthongs. A reason given to support this analysis is that the diphthongs "act as unit phonemes in regard to stress."

It is not necessary to postulate that the long vowels and diphthongs should be counted as separate single phonemes, because they can be treated as sequences of two vowels. They are in fact historically derived from two-syllable sequences. This is easily seen in the synchronic co-existence of allomorphic pairs of Hawaiian forms such as kolu with -kou, both meaning 'three'.

The example can be analyzed as a four-phoneme CVCV sequence alternating with a three-phoneme CVV sequence, where the CVV form is derived from the CVCV form through loss of the second consonant. Kolu is a root form, while -kou is found in the plural personal pronouns (indicating three or more referents) mākou, kākou, oukou, and lākou.

Vowels in Hawaiian have been described as invariably oral, even when adjacent to nasal consonants, while , describing a native speaker who has non-native-speaking parents and acquired the language in the revitalization movement, found consistent vowel nasalization in post-nasal environments:  loina 'custom'.

The vowel phonemes are shown in the following tables. The information given on allophones constitutes a basic description, not exception-free laws. Native speakers of any language can get away with tweaking their own personal pronunciation.

Monophthongs 
{| class="wikitable" style="text-align: center;"
|+ Monophthongs
! rowspan="2" |
! colspan="3" | Short
! colspan="3" | Long
|-
! Front
! Central
! Back
! Front
! Central
! Back
|-
! Close
| 
|
| 
| 
|
| 
|-
! Mid
| 
| rowspan="2" | 
| 
| 
|
| 
|-
! Open
|
|
|
| 
|
|}

For example, eleele ('black') is pronounced . But aleale ('full') is pronounced .
 Short  is phonetically  when stressed and  when unstressed.

Diphthongs 
The following tables show Hawaiian's system of diphthongs, all of which are falling.

{| class="wikitable" style="text-align: center;"
|+ Short diphthongs
!
! Ending with 
! Ending with 
! Ending with 
! Ending with 
|-
! Starting with 
| 
|
|
|
|-
! Starting with 
| 
| 
|
|
|-
! Starting with 
| 
| 
|
|
|-
! Starting with 
| 
| 
| 
| 
|}

In rapid speech,  and  can become  and  respectively.

{| class="wikitable" style="text-align: center;"
|+ Long diphthongs
!
! Ending with 
! Ending with 
! Ending with 
! Ending with 
|-
! Starting with 
| | 
|
|
|
|-
! Starting with 
|
| 
|
|
|-
! Starting with 
| 
| 
| 
| 
|}

Phonotactics
Hawaiian syllables may contain one consonant in the onset, or there is no onset. Codas and consonant clusters are prohibited in the phonotactics of Hawaiian words of Austronesian origin. However, the borrowed word Kristo is pronounced .

The structure of the Hawaiian syllable can be represented as being (C)V(V), where the C represents an optional initial consonant, the first V represents a vowel which may be long or short, and the optional second V represents the second element of a valid long or short diphthong.
 
 V syllables. Every theoretically possible V syllable occurs in Hawaiian.
 CV syllables. Every theoretically possible CV syllable occurs, with the single exception of wū. The syllable wu occurs only in borrowed words.

Elbert & Pukui have pointed out that "Certain combinations of sounds are absent or rare." For example, no content word has the form , and the form , is also not common. They also noted that monovocalic content words are always long.

Stress 
Word stress is predictable in Hawaiian for words with three or fewer moras (that is, three or fewer vowels, with diphthongs and long vowels counting as two vowels). In such cases, stress is always on the second to last mora. Longer words will also follow this pattern, but may in addition have a second stressed syllable which is not predictable. In Hawaiian, a stressed syllable is louder in volume, longer in duration and higher in pitch.

 CVCV, VCV, with both vowels short: áhi, káhi
 CVCVCV, CVVCV, VCVCV, VVCV—that is, as in (1) but preceded by a short syllable: uáhi, alóha, huáli, kakáhi
 CVV, VV, with either a long vowel or diphthong: ái, wái, ā (= áa), nā (náa)
 CVCVV, VCVV, CVVV, VVV—that is, same as (3) but preceded by a short syllable: uái, uhái, kuái, wawái, iā (= iáa), inā (ináa), huā (huáa), nanā (nanáa)

For other Hawaiian words longer than three moras, stress is not predictable (but cf. ). However, every word can be analyzed as consisting of a sequence of these stress units:

 éle.makúle ('old man'), stressed as CVCV plus CVCVCV
 makúa.híne ('mother'), stressed as CVCVV plus CVCV

Etymology is not a reliable guide to stress. For example, the following proper names are both composed of three words, of 1, 2, and 2 moras, but their stress patterns differ:

 Ka-imu-kī, pronounced kái.mukíi Ka-ahu-manu, pronounced kaáhu.mánuPhonological processes
Phonological processes at work in Hawaiian include palatalization of consonants, deletion of consonants, raising and diphthongization of vowels, deletion of unstressed syllables, and compensatory lengthening of vowels.

Kinney (1956) studied tape recordings of 13 or 14 native speakers of Hawaiian. She noted assimilatory raising of vowels in vowel sequences.

More recent observations suggest that  and  have since fallen into a largely complementary distribution in colloquial Niihau speech, with  generally found in a syllable before .

References

Bibliography 
 
 
 
 
 
 
 
 
 
 
 
 
 
 

Hawaiian language
Austronesian phonologies